Comyopsis is a genus of parasitic flies in the family Tachinidae.

Species
Comyopsis fumata Townsend, 1919

Distribution
Puerto Rico, Trinidad & Tobago, Nicaragua.

References

Diptera of North America
Dexiinae
Tachinidae genera
Monotypic Brachycera genera
Taxa named by Charles Henry Tyler Townsend